The McCosker's worm eel (Neenchelys mccoskeri) is an eel in the family Ophichthidae (worm/snake eels). It was described by Yusuke Hibino, Ho Hsuan-Ching, and Seishi Kimura in 2012. It is a marine, deep water-dwelling eel which is known from the northwestern Pacific Ocean, including Taiwan and Japan.

The species epithet "mccoskeri" was given in honour of American ichthyologist John E. McCosker.

References

Fish described in 2012
Neenchelys